Daryl L. Hecht (June 25, 1952 – April 3, 2019) was a justice on the Iowa Supreme Court and president of Iowa Trial Lawyers Association.

Early life and education 
Raised on a family farm near Lytton, Iowa, Hecht received a Bachelor of Arts in history and political science from Morningside College in 1974 and a Juris Doctor from the University of South Dakota School of Law in 1977.  Hecht worked in private practice in Sioux City, Iowa for 22 years. His practice included plaintiff civil litigation, workers' compensation, and appeals.

State judicial service
In 1999 Hecht was appointed to the Iowa Court of Appeals by Governor Tom Vilsack. In 2004, Hecht received a Master of Laws from the University of Virginia School of Law. On August 1, 2006, Hecht was appointed by Governor Vilsack to the Iowa Supreme Court. He succeeded Chief Justice Louis A. Lavorato upon Lavorato's retirement and joined the Supreme Court on September 30, 2006. In August 2017, he was retained in a retention election with 64% of the vote. Hecht continued to live in Sioux City as a judge on the Court of Appeals and the Supreme Court. Hecht worked on civil justice reform with the Institute for the Advancement of the Legal System, the National Center for State Courts, and the Conference of Chief Justices.

Hecht, through a press release from the Iowa Judicial Branch on November 16, 2018, announced his retirement from the court due to his battle with skin cancer. His resignation took effect December 13, 2018.

Death
Hecht died on April 3, 2019, at the age of 66 from melanoma. Hecht and his wife Sandy had two daughters.

References

External links
Ballotpedia Profile 
VoteSmart Profile

1952 births
2019 deaths
Justices of the Iowa Supreme Court
Morningside University alumni
People from Sioux City, Iowa
University of South Dakota School of Law alumni
University of Virginia School of Law alumni
21st-century American judges
Iowa lawyers
People from Sac County, Iowa
Deaths from skin cancer
Deaths from cancer in Iowa
20th-century American judges
20th-century American lawyers